The WTA Tour is the elite tour for professional women's tennis organised by the Women's Tennis Association (WTA). The WTA Tour includes the four Grand Slam tournaments, the WTA Tour Championships and the WTA Tier I, Tier II, Tier III and Tier IV events. ITF tournaments are not part of the WTA Tour, although they award points for the WTA World Ranking.

Schedule 
The table below shows the 1995 WTA Tour schedule.

Key

January

February

March

April

May

June

July

August

September

October

November

Statistical Information 

List of players and titles won, last name alphabetically:
 Steffi Graf – Paris, Delray Beach, Miami, Houston, French Open, Wimbledon, US Open, Philadelphia, WTA Tour Championships (9)
 Conchita Martínez – Hilton Head, Amelia Island, Hamburg, Rome, San Diego, Manhattan Beach (6)
 Magdalena Maleeva – Chicago, Moscow, Oakland (3)
 Mary Joe Fernández – Indian Wells, Brighton (2)
 Iva Majoli – Zurich, Filderstadt (2)
 Barbara Paulus – Warsaw, Pattaya City (2)
 Mary Pierce – Australian Open, Tokyo (Tier II) (2)
 Arantxa Sánchez Vicario – Barcelona, Berlin (2)
 Brenda Schultz-McCarthy – Oklahoma City, Quebec City (2)
 Linda Wild – Nagoya, Beijing (2)
 Sabine Appelmans – Zagreb (1)
 Nicole Bradtke – Auckland (1)
 Kimiko Date – Tokyo (Tier I) (1)
 Lindsay Davenport – Strasbourg (1)
 Amy Frazier – Tokyo (Tier III) (1)
 Zina Garrison-Jackson – Birmingham (1)
 Sabine Hack – Jakarta (1)
 Julie Halard – Prague (1)
 Anke Huber – Leipzig (1)
 Joannette Kruger – San Juan (1)
 Leila Meskhi – Hobart (1)
 Jana Novotná – Linz (1)
 Ludmila Richterová – Bournemouth (1)
 Gabriela Sabatini – Sydney (1)
 Monica Seles – Toronto (1)
 Irina Spîrlea – Palermo (1)
 Nathalie Tauziat – Eastbourne (1)
 Wang Shi-ting – Surabaya (1)
 Judith Wiesner – Styria (1)

The following players won their first title:
  Joannette Kruger – San Juan
  Ludmila Richterová – Bournemouth
  Iva Majoli – Zurich

Rankings 
Below are the 1995 WTA year-end rankings in both singles and doubles competition:

See also 
 1995 ATP Tour

References 

 
WTA Tour
1995 WTA Tour